Monte Pastello is a mountain of the Veneto, Italy. The mountain, which has an elevation of 1,128 metres, is part of the Monti Lessini in the Venetian Prealps. It is located in the Province of Verona.

References

Mountains of Veneto